The State of North Queensland is a proposed state of Australia, to be formed out of the current state of Queensland.

History
Under the Constitution of Australia, Chapter VI, Section 124:  

In 1852, John Dunmore Lang proposed – in his book Freedom and Independence for the Golden Lands of Australia – the division of the future colony of Queensland into three subdivisions.

A committee of businessmen in Townsville first pushed for a separate state in July 1882.

The separatist movement in North Queensland was fostered by the sugar planters, who saw the existence of the sugar industry threatened by the "abolitionist" movement in South Queensland for the suppression of Kanaka labour. One proposal is that Queensland should be divided by the 22nd parallel south with the boundary running just south of Sarina on the coast to the Northern Territory border between Boulia and Mount Isa

According to The Courier-Mail in 2010, the majority of North Queensland mayors were in favour of the separation from Queensland proper. Only two of the 100 delegates at the NQ Local Government Association meeting were against the proposal – the two being Mayor Val Schier (Cairns) and Mayor Ben Callcott (Charters Towers).

In 2013, social demographer Bernard Salt said that Townsville would go from regional powerhouse to metropolitan city by 2026, and that there are fewer people living in the state of Tasmania than in North Queensland.

Supporters of the North Queensland state include Geoffrey Blainey, and Member of Parliament Bob Katter and former member Clive Palmer.

One of many proposals stated that North Queensland would contain 785,890 people, ranking slightly above that of Tasmania, although lower than that of South Australia. In area, it would be 735,300 square kilometres, ranking between New South Wales and Victoria, and bringing Queensland down to the third largest state/territory in Australia.

In the election periods of September 2016 and also October 2020 Katter's Australian Party sought to split Queensland into two states.  It was also in 2016 the Liberal National Party state convention voted down a motion to hold a referendum at a state convention.

MP Bill Byrne believes that a North Queensland state would not be economically viable, as mining royalties are only a modest portion of the entire Queensland state budget (only $2-3 billion of $50 billion state budget), while costs for delivering power would be much higher without money from South-East Queensland consumers.

Proposed flags

Cities and towns

Organisations in favour
Katter's Australian Party (2011–present)
North Queensland First (2019–2021)

See also

Central Queensland Territorial Separation League
Regionalism
Separatism
North Queensland

References

North Queensland
Far North Queensland
Proposed states and territories of Australia